Styramate is a muscle relaxant and anticonvulsant drug. At therapeutic doses, it does not produce significant sedative effects.

See also 
 Carisbamate

Further reading 

 
 

Carbamates
GABAA receptor positive allosteric modulators